Qualification for the men's tournament at the 2022 Winter Olympics was determined by the IIHF World Ranking following the 2019 Men's Ice Hockey World Championships. The host along with the top eight teams in the world ranking received automatic berths into the Olympics, while all other teams have an opportunity to qualify for the remaining three spots in the Olympics.

Qualified teams
{| class="wikitable"
!Event
!Date
!Location
!Vacancies
!Qualified
|-
|Hosts
|17 May 2018
| Copenhagen
|align=center|1
|
|-
|2019 IIHF World Ranking
|31 March 2016 – 26 May 2019
| Bratislava and Košice
|align=center|8
|
|-
|rowspan=3|Final qualification tournaments
|rowspan=3|26–29 August 2021
| Bratislava
|align=center|1
|
|-
| Riga
|align=center|1
|
|-
| Oslo
|align=center|1
|
|-
! Total !! colspan=2| !! 12 !!
|}

Notes

Qualification seeding
To qualify directly, a nation had to be ranked in the top eight following the 2019 Men's World Ice Hockey Championships. Using the IIHF World Ranking points system, the current year received full value, and each preceding year was worth 25% less. The following is a ranking based on points that were accumulated toward Olympic qualification of all countries participating in 2019.

Points were earned based on overall finish in 2019:

Teams with no seeding chose not to participate in Olympic qualifying.

Pre-qualification Round 1
Eight teams began the qualification process in two tournaments. The winners of each tournament advanced to round 2 as qualifiers ten and eleven, where qualifier ten was the winner with the higher qualification seeding.

Group N
Games were played in Kockelscheuer, Luxembourg from 8 to 10 November 2019.

All times are local (UTC+1).

Group O
Due to unrest in Hong Kong this tournament was moved to Sanya, China, and was played from 7 to 10 November 2019.

All times are local (UTC+8).

Pre-qualification Round 2
Twelve countries played in three tournaments to determine qualifiers for the next round. Each tournament winner was ranked by their qualification seeding and entered the next round as qualifier seven, eight, or nine.

Group K

All times are local (UTC+2).

Group L

All times are local (UTC+1).

 The game was originally supposed to be played on 15 December 2019 but was stopped after a scoreless first period because of problems with the ice surface.

Group M

All times are local (UTC+1).

Pre-qualification Round 3

Group G

All times are local (UTC+1).

Group H

All times are local (UTC+6).

Group J

All times are local (UTC±0).

Final qualification
The tournaments were scheduled to take place from 27 to 30 August 2020, but were moved to 26 to 29 August 2021 due to the COVID-19 pandemic.

Group D
The tournament was held at the Ondrej Nepela Arena in Bratislava, Slovakia.

All times are local (UTC+2).

Group E
The tournament was played at the Arēna Rīga in Riga, Latvia.

All times are local (UTC+3).

Group F
The tournament was played at the Jordal Amfi in Oslo, Norway.

All times are local (UTC+2).

Graphical summary

References

qualification
Qualification for the 2022 Winter Olympics
2019 in ice hockey
2020 in ice hockey
2021 in ice hockey
Impact of the COVID-19 pandemic on sports